Route 212, also known as Bay L’Argent Road, is a  north–south highway on the Burin Peninsula of the island of Newfoundland in the Canadian province of Newfoundland and Labrador. It connects several communities along the northeastern corner of Fortune Bay with Route 210 (Heritage Run/Burin Peninsula Highway).

Route description

Route 212 begins southeast of St. Bernard's-Jacques Fontaine at an intersection with Route 210 and heads northwest through wooded and hilly terrain for several kilometres to pass through the Jacques Fontaine portion of town. It now winds its way northeast along the coastline to pass through Bay L'Argent, where one can access a Ferry to Rencontre East, and then Little Bay East. The highway now becomes very curvy and winding as it heads through hilly terrain for the next several kilometres to pass through Little Harbour East. Route 212 now enters Harbour Mille comes to an end shortly thereafter in the centre of town.

Major intersections

References

212